Star Frontiers is a science fiction role-playing game produced by TSR from 1982 to 1985. The game offered a space opera action-adventure setting.

Fictional setting 
Star Frontiers takes place near the center of a spiral galaxy (the setting does not specify whether the galaxy is our own Milky Way). A previously undiscovered quirk of the laws of physics allows starships to jump to "The Void", a hyperspatial realm that greatly shortens the travel times between inhabited worlds, once they reach 1% of the speed of light (3,000 km/s).

The basic game setting was an area known as "The Frontier Sector" where four sentient races (Dralasite, Humans, Vrusk, and Yazirian) had met and formed the United Planetary Federation (UPF). A large number of the star systems shown on the map of the Frontier sector in the basic rulebook were unexplored and undetailed, allowing the Gamemaster (called the "referee" in the game) to put whatever they wished there.

Players could take on any number of possible roles in the setting but the default was to act as hired agents of the Pan Galactic corporation in exploring the Frontier and fighting the aggressive incursions of the alien and mysterious worm-like race known as the Sathar. Most published modules for the game followed these themes.

Publication history 
The Star Frontiers (1982) basic boxed set was later renamed Star Frontiers: Alpha Dawn after the expansions began publication. It included two ten-sided dice, a large set of cardboard counters, and a folding map with a futuristic city on one side and various wilderness areas on the other for use with the included adventure, SF-0: Crash on Volturnus.

A second boxed set called Knight Hawks (1983) followed shortly. It provided rules for using starships in the setting and also a set of wargame rules for fighting space battles between the UPF and Sathar. Included were counters for starships, two-ten sided dice, a large folding map with open space on one side and on the other a space station and starship (for use with the included adventure), and the adventure SFKH-0: Warriors of White Light. This set was designed by Douglas Niles (who also designed the D&D wargame Battlesystem, released two years later).

Adventures printed separately for the game included two more adventures set on Volturnus (SF-1: Volturnus, Planet of Mystery (1982) and SF-2: Starspawn of Volturnus (1982) continuing the adventure included in the basic set), SF-3: Sundown on Starmist (1983), SF-4: Mission to Alcazzar (1984), SF-5: Bugs in the System (1985) and SF-6: Dark Side of the Moon (1985). The last two modules (SF-5 and SF-6) were written by authors from TSR's UK division, and are distinctly different from the others in the series in tone and production style.

Adventures using the Knight Hawks rules included SFKH-1: Dramune Run (1984) and a trilogy set "Beyond the Frontier" in which the players learn more about the Sathar and foil their latest plot (SFKH-2: Mutiny on the Eleanor Moraes (1984), SFKH-3: Face of the Enemy (1985), and SFKH-4: The War Machine (1985)).

Two modules also re-created the plot and setting of the movies 2001: A Space Odyssey and 2010: Odyssey Two.

A late addition to the line was Zebulon's Guide to Frontier Space (1985) which introduced several additional races and radical changes to the game's mechanics. Of the three planned volumes of the Guide, only the first was ever published (in 1985), leaving the game in a partially-overhauled state.

d20 Modern 
The Star Frontiers campaign setting was later updated for the d20 Modern role-playing game system published by Wizards of the Coast; the science fiction supplement d20 Future (2004) included "short notes on eight different settings, most of which refer to older publications from TSR and Wizards of the Coast". Of these eight, Star Law was the "new take" on Star Frontiers (1982). Additionally, the Dralasite, Vrusk, and Yazirian were included in the book's aliens.

Fictional sapient races 

Dralasites are short, gray amoeboid-like creatures (they are actually multi-cellular unlike true amoebas) capable of changing their form to a limited extent by extending and retracting pseudopods. Lacking a digestive system, they consume their food by surrounding and absorbing it. A network of nerves and veins intersects at a Dralasite's two eye spots. They cannot see colors, but have a well-developed sense of smell.  They have a sense of humor that the other races often find strange or quirky, and a love of bad puns.
Humans are a race of beings virtually identical to Earthly humans but with 200-year lifespan (possibly due to the advanced technology of the setting).
Vrusk are an insectoid race with eight walking legs and two five-clawed manipulating arms. Their ant-like heads included two antennae and two mandibles. They are omnivorous. They are noted for their logical minds and their society is structured as commercial ventures. Many Vrusk give their company name before their given name.
The Yazirian race are anthropoids similar to various terrestrial apes. They are muzzled, lightly furred, and have patagia stretching between their arms and legs which they can use to glide over short distances in low gravity (their home worlds are all low-gravity). They are descended from a nocturnal species, and prefer to wear tinted goggles to protect their eyesight during the day. They are said to be rather violent and pushy, and have a custom to choose a "life-enemy", which could be anything; a company, person, or a concept. The fictional species was rehashed as Shadow People in TSR's later Dragonlance series of campaign modules and also as the Hadozee race presented first in Spelljammer and secondly in Stormwrack. Yazirians share several points with the High Martians of GDW's later Space: 1889 RPG. Yazirians, like Wookiees in Star Wars and certain game depictions of fantasy Barbarians, have a "battle rage" or a berserker state of mind.

These races were altered heavily and reused in TSR's Spelljammer, and were later republished for d20 Future by Wizards of the Coast.

The Sathar are a race of mysterious, worm-like beings who are the enemies of the UPF (they are not intended to be used as a player race). They have wormlike bodies of 3 to 4 meters in length with two tentacular arms that end in fine tentacles for manipulation and two tentacles that end in paddles that can be used for heavy lifting (including acting as "legs", lifting the front of the creature off the ground in a humanoid-like stance).  Their eyes have two pupils each, giving them good peripheral vision. The races of the Frontier know little about them other than their basic anatomy and the fact that they are hostile, as no live Sathar has ever been captured. Some of the behaviors and motives of the Sathar were revealed in the printed adventures for the game, and adventures commonly featured mercenaries working for the Sathar to undermine the UPF as villains.
There are also other non-player races in the Star Frontiers universe, including many in the printed modules, but these five are the only races who developed space drive technology within the Frontier.
Several new player races appeared in a late addition to the line, Zebulon's Guide to Frontier Space, and include the Humma (which resemble kangaroos), Ifshnit (akin to dwarves), Osakar (lanky, parthenogenic quadrupeds) and  Mechanons (intelligent robots).

Game mechanics 
The game was a percentile-based system and used only 10-sided dice (d10). Characters had attributes rated from 1-100 (usually in the 25-75 range) which could be rolled against for raw-attribute actions such as lifting items or getting out of the way of falling rocks. There were eight attributes that were paired together (and shared the same rating to begin with)—Strength/Stamina, Dexterity/Reaction Speed, Intuition/Logic, and Personality/Leadership.

Characters also each had a Primary Skill Area (PSA—Military, Technological, or Biosocial) which allowed them to buy skills that fell into their PSA at a discount. Skills were rated from 1–6 and usually consisted of a set of subskills that gave a chance for accomplishing a particular action as a base percentage plus a 10% bonus for each skill level the character had in the skill. Weapon skills were based on the character's relevant attribute (Dexterity or Strength) but other skills had a base chance of success independent of the character's attributes. Many of the technological skills were penalized by the complexity of the robot, security system, or computer the character was attempting to manipulate (also rated from 1 to 6).

Characters were usually quite durable in combat—it would take several hits from normal weapons to kill an average character. Medical technology was also advanced—characters could recover quickly from wounds with appropriate medical attention and a dead character could be "frozen" and revived later.

Vehicle and robot rules were included in the Alpha Dawn basic set. A beneficial feature of the game was its seamless integration of personal, vehicle and aerial combat simulation. The Knight Hawks rules expansion set included detailed rules for starships. The basic set also included a short "bestiary" of creatures native to the world of Volturnus (the setting for the introductory module included with the basic boxed set), along with rules for creating new creatures.

Character advancement consisted of spending experience points on improving skills and attributes.

Character Record Sheets

Star Frontiers Character Record Sheets is a supplement published by TSR in 1984 for the science fiction role-playing game Star Frontiers. In addition to adventures, several game aids were released, including the Star Frontiers Referee's Screen and Mini-Module  in 1983, and the Star Frontiers Character Record Sheets in 1984, a 32-page book of character sheets with cover art was by Larry Elmore.  Stephen Nutt reviewed Star Frontiers Character Record Sheets for Imagine magazine, and stated that "it makes up handsomely for the originals in the boxed set, which are rather pedestrian in comparison."

Reception
Andy Slack reviewed Star Frontiers for White Dwarf #37, giving it an overall rating of 7 out of 10, and stated that "Unfortunately, I can't say the system struck me as especially realistic; but if you like action adventure, thinking with your fists, and Star Wars (and who doesn't from time to time) you can have a lot of fun with this game."

William A. Barton reviewed Star Frontiers in The Space Gamer No. 60. Barton commented that "Star Frontiers probably isn't going to lose TSR any money. But I wish there were a lot more to commend it than that."

Jim Bambra reviewed Star Frontiers for Imagine magazine, and said that "In summary, the Starfrontiers game is an excellent introduction to Sci Fi gaming, a game I heartily recommend to beginners and experienced gamers. A lot of expertise has gone into the designing of this product and the result is a very enjoyable and easy to learn game."

In a retrospective review of Star Frontiers in Black Gate, Patrick Kanouse said "Star Frontiers remains a playable and enjoyable game. A group of devoted fans have kept the game alive and expanded on it, so if you're looking for an easy-to-learn RPG with a focus on action, give it a go. I think you may like the retrofuture it inhabits."

Reviews
Asimov's Science Fiction v7 n11 (1983 11)
Jeux & Stratégie #36

Subsequent legal dispute over trademark 

In 2021, a new iteration of TSR Games was launched by a group including Ernie Gygax, son of the deceased Tactical Studies Rules (TSR) co-founder Gary Gygax, and Justin LaNasa. They announced plans to release tabletop games and operate the Dungeon Hobby Shop Museum, which is located in the first office building of the original TSR. In July 2022, TechRaptor reported on a leaked Star Frontiers: New Genesis (a reboot of Star Frontiers) playtest created by LaNasa's TSR; the content contains "blatantly racist" descriptions of character races and the race design "plays into Nazi eugenics". The content also contains "homophobic, transphobic, and anti-semitic content, as well as additional material of a discriminatory nature". IGN Southeast Asia highlighted that in this playtest game a black "race is classified as a 'Subrace' and having 'average' intellect with a maximum intelligence rating of 9, whereas the 'norse' race has a minimum intelligence rating of 13".

In September 2022, Wizards of the Coast sued TSR Games and the Dungeon Hobby Shop Museum to enjoin these companies from publishing games under the "Star Frontiers" and "TSR" trademarks. In its motion for a preliminary injunction, Wizards of the Coast wrote that TSR's Star Frontiers: New Genesis game is "despicable" and "blatantly racist and transphobic", and that the publication of such content would inflict reputational harm on Wizards of the Coast. Charlie Hall, for Polygon, commented that "Wizards' filing also seeks to undermine LaNasa's most powerful argument — that Wizards abandoned TSR and other related trademarks, thus opening the door to his usurping of the brand and its games. [...] Here's where things get complicated. Wizards admits that it failed to file paperwork for the registration of TSR, Star Frontiers, and other related marks in a timely fashion as required under federal law. But through continued sales of related products and use of the related IP, the company claims ownership via 'common law trademark rights.' It will be up to a jury to determine if that is, in fact, the case".

References

External links
 StarFrontiers.org - Includes downloadable RuleBooks for Knight Hawks and Alpha Dawn and other material (via the Wayback Machine).
 StarFrontiers.com - Features legal PDF downloads of the game (via the Wayback Machine).
 The Star Frontiers Network - Site designed for hosting on-line Star Frontiers games and software development.
 Star Frontiers Revival Site: Devoted to collaborative community development and discussion of Star Frontiers.
 Frontier Explorer Magazine - Free fan-created electronic magazine with articles and other content related to Star Frontiers.

 
Role-playing games introduced in 1982
Space opera role-playing games
TSR, Inc. games